Charles Lannie (21 August 1881 – 3 June 1958) was a Belgian gymnast. He competed in the men's team all-around event at the 1920 Summer Olympics, winning the silver medal.

References

External links
 

1881 births
1958 deaths
Belgian male artistic gymnasts
Olympic gymnasts of Belgium
Gymnasts at the 1920 Summer Olympics
Olympic silver medalists for Belgium
Medalists at the 1920 Summer Olympics
Olympic medalists in gymnastics
People from Boom, Belgium
Sportspeople from Antwerp Province